Hans Hunziker (2 August 1878 – 17 December 1941) was a Swiss psychiatrist, professor of social medicine at University of Basel, head of the Cantonal Health Office of Basel-Stadt, and notable for his contributions on neuropsychiatry.

Publications
Die Basler Thyphusepidemie vom August 1931. Lecture / Paper presented at the Medical Society of Basel, 3 December 1931. Schweizerische Medizinische Wochenschrift, vol. 62, issue 38. Basel: Benno Schwabe, 1932.
Das Wasser als Träger von Krankheitskeimen. Lecture / Paper presented at the 58th Annual assembly of the Swiss Gas and water professionals association (SVGW) in Basel, 5 September 1931. Monats-Bulletin des Schweizerischen Vereins von Gas- und Wasserfachmännern. Zurich, 1931, Nr.10.
“Die Bedeutung des Rheinstauwerks Kembs für die Abwasseranlage und den Grundwasserstand der Stadt Basel und die zur Vermeidung hygienischer Misstände notwendigen Massnahmen”. In: Technische Hygiene, Schweizerische Zeitschrift für Strassenwesen, Zurich, 1931, Nr.7/8.
“Hygienische Gesichtspunkte beim Bau des neuen Zentralfriedhofes in Basel”. In: Technische Hygiene, Schweizerische Zeitschrift für Strassenwesen Nr.5. Solothurn: Vogt-Schild, 1931.
“Welche Anforderungen sind an den Hygieneunterricht für Lehrer und Schüler zu stellen?”. Schweizerische Zeitschrift für Gesundheitspflege und Archiv für Sozialfürsorge. vol. VIII, Nr.5. Zurich: Gutswiller, 1928.
“Der Kampf gegen das Kurpfuschertum in der Schweiz”. Veröffentlichungen aus dem Gebiete der Medizinalverwaltung. vol. 27, Nr. 8. Berlin: Schoetz, 1928. p. 7-16.

Further reading
Georg Boner. Die Universität Basel in den Jahren 1914–1939. F. Reinhardt, Basel 1943.

External links 
 Obituary, Journal of Nervous & Mental Disease, August 1942. Vol.96. p. 238.
 Obituaries, Staatsarchiv Basel-Stadt.

1878 births
1941 deaths
People from Zofingen District
University of Zurich alumni
Academic staff of the University of Basel
Swiss psychiatrists